Renfrew North (also known as Renfrew North—Nipissing East) was a federal electoral district represented in the House of Commons of Canada from 1867 to 1979. It was located in the province of Ontario. It was created by the British North America Act of 1867.  The riding existed until 1972, when the name was changed to "Renfrew North—Nipissing East".

The North Riding of Renfrew initially consisted of the Townships of Ross, Bromley, Westmeath, Stafford, Pembroke, Wilberforce, Alice, Petawawa, Buchanan, South Algona, North Algona, Fraser, McKay, Wylie, Rolph, Head, Maria, Clara, Haggerty, Sherwood, Burns, Richards, and any other surveyed Townships lying northwesterly of the said North Riding.

In 1892, "North Renfrew" was redefined to consist of the town of Pembroke, that part of the village of Eganville north of the River Bonnechère, and the townships of Ross, Bromley, Westmeath, Stafford, Pembroke, Wilberforce, Alice, Petawawa, Buchanan, South Algona, North Algona, Fraser, McKay, Wylie and Rolph.

In 1903, it was redefined to consist of the townships of Algona North, Algona South, Alice, Bromley, Buchanan, Fraser, McKay, Pembroke, Petawawa, Rolph, Ross, Stafford, Westmeath, Wilberforce and Wylie, the town of Pembroke, the village of Cobden, and the part of the village of Eganville lying within the township of Wilberforce.

In 1924, "Renfrew North" was defined to consist of that part of the county of Renfrew lying north and east and including the townships of Ross, Bromley, Wilberforce, Algona (North and South), and Fraser, and including the part of the territorial district of Nipissing lying east of and including the townships of Cameron, Deacon, Anglin, Dickson, Preston, and Airy.

It was redefined several times following that, but generally included most of Renfrew County and the eastern part of Nipissing.

The electoral district was abolished in 1976 when it was redistributed between Nipissing, Parry Sound—Muskoka and Renfrew—Nipissing—Pembroke ridings.

Members of Parliament

This riding has elected the following Members of Parliament:

Election results

|- 
  
|Conservative
|John Rankin 
|align="right"|  613    
 
|Unknown
|Thomas Murray
|align="right"| 527    
|}

|- 
  
|Liberal-Conservative
|Francis Hincks
|align="right"|  560    
  
|Liberal
|James Findlay
|align="right"| 440   
|}

|-
  
|Liberal
|James Findlay
|align="right"| 777   
  
|Conservative
|Peter White 
|align="right"| 675    
|}

|-
  
|Conservative
|Peter White 
|align="right"| 600    
  
|Liberal
|Thomas Murray
|align="right"| 498   
 
|Unknown
|W. Moffatt 
|align="right"|328    
|}

|-
  
|Liberal
|William Murray
|align="right"|889   
  
|Conservative
|Peter White 
|align="right"|841    
|}

|-
  
|Conservative
|Peter White 
|align="right"| 1,192    
  
|Liberal
|William Murray
|align="right"|982   
|}

|-
  
|Conservative
|Peter White 
|align="right"| 1,273    
 
|Unknown
|James Findlay
|align="right"|920  
|}

|-
  
|Conservative
|Peter White 
|align="right"| 1,111    
 
|Unknown
|Thomas Murray 
|align="right"|968   
|}

|-
  
|Conservative
|Peter White 
|align="right"| 1,534    
  
|Liberal
|James Findlay 
|align="right"|1,286   
|}

|-
  
|Conservative
|Peter White
|align="right"| 1,497    
  
|Liberal
|Henry Barr
|align="right"|1,418   
|}

|-
  
|Liberal
|Thomas Mackie 
|align="right"| 1,900   
  
|Conservative
|Peter White
|align="right"|1,837    
|}

|-
  
|Liberal
|Thomas Mackie
|align="right"| 2,299   
  
|Conservative
|Peter White
|align="right"| 2,167    
|}

|-
  
|Conservative
|Peter White
|align="right"|  2,495    
  
|Liberal
|Thomas Mackie
|align="right"| 2,275   
|}

|-
  
|Conservative
|Gerald Verner White 
|align="right"| 2,167    
 
|Unknown
|Thomas Murray
|align="right"| 1,166  
|}

|-
  
|Conservative
|Gerald Verner White
|align="right"| 2,493    
  
|Liberal
|Henry Barr
|align="right"|1,894   
|}

|-
  
|Conservative
|Gerald Verner White 
|align="right"| 2,573    
  
|Liberal
|James Francis Munro
|align="right"| 1,865   
|}

|-
  
|Government (Unionist)
|Herbert John Mackie  
|align="right"| 3,397   
  
|Opposition (Laurier Liberals)
|Norman Reid
|align="right"| 2,873   
|}

|-
  
|Liberal
|Matthew McKay 
|align="right"| 3,828   

  
|Conservative
|Ira Delbert Cotnam
|align="right"| 3,015    
|}

|-
  
|Conservative
|Ira Delbert Cotnam
|align="right"|  5,303    
  
|Liberal
|Matthew McKay
|align="right"| 4,529   
|}

|-
  
|Conservative
|Ira Delbert Cotnam
|align="right"|  4,947    
  
|Liberal
|Matthew McKay  
|align="right"| 4,288   

|}

|-
  
|Conservative
|Ira Delbert Cotnam 
|align="right"| 6,125    
  
|Liberal
|Matthew McKay
|align="right"| 4,897   
|}

|-
  
|Liberal
|Matthew McKay
|align="right"| 6,052   
  
|Conservative
|Ira Delbert Cotnam
|align="right"| 4,134    

|}

|-
  
|Liberal
|Ralph Warren 
|align="right"| 5,863   
  
|Conservative
|Edgar Troy Wood
|align="right"| 5,459    
|}

|-
  
|Liberal
|Ralph Warren 
|align="right"| 6,199   
 
|National Government
|Edgar Troy Wood
|align="right"|  4,536    
 
|Co-operative Commonwealth
|Delmar Vondette
|align="right"| 709   
|}

|-
  
|Liberal
|Ralph Warren 
|align="right"| 6,828   
  
|Progressive Conservative
|William Francis Johnston
|align="right"| 5,882    
 
|Co-operative Commonwealth
|John Charles Wright
|align="right"| 1,555   
|}

|-
  
|Liberal
|Ralph Warren 
|align="right"| 8,358   
  
|Progressive Conservative
|Ira Delbert Cotnam
|align="right"| 6,598    
 
|Co-operative Commonwealth
|John Charles Wright
|align="right"| 1,530   
|}

|-
  
|Liberal
|James Forgie 
|align="right"|  9,360   
  
|Progressive Conservative
|Ira Delbert Cotnam
|align="right"|7,268    
|}

|-
  
|Liberal
|James Forgie
|align="right"| 10,227   
  
|Progressive Conservative
|Wallace James Fraser
|align="right"| 9,132    
|}

|-
  
|Liberal
|James Forgie  
|align="right"| 10,425   
  
|Progressive Conservative
|Stanley J. Hunt
|align="right"|10,226    
|}

|-
  
|Liberal
|James Forgie 
|align="right"| 11,313   
  
|Progressive Conservative
|Thomas P. Dodd
|align="right"| 9,348    

 
|New Democratic
|Wilfred L. Charbonneau
|align="right"|902    
|}

|-
  
|Liberal
|James Forgie 
|align="right"|  11,580   
  
|Progressive Conservative
|E. Mac Fraser
|align="right"| 9,089    

 
|New Democratic
|Wilfred L. Charbonneau
|align="right"|947    
|}

|-
  
|Liberal
|Len Hopkins 
|align="right"|10,882   
  
|Progressive Conservative
|Donald B. Cruikshank
|align="right"| 5,846    
 
|Independent
|Angus A. Campbell
|align="right"| 2,812   
 
|New Democratic
|Lorne E. Catherwood
|align="right"| 2,021    
|}

|-
  
|Liberal
|Len Hopkins 
|align="right"| 13,195   
  
|Progressive Conservative
|Del O'Brien
|align="right"|  7,976    
 
|New Democratic
|Kenneth C. Widenmaier
|align="right"| 1,813    
|}

|-
  
|Liberal
|Len Hopkins
|align="right"| 13,553   
  
|Progressive Conservative
|George A. Kinney
|align="right"|  8,440    
 
|New Democratic
|Maurice R. Payne
|align="right"| 3,177    
|}

|-
  
|Liberal
|Len Hopkins
|align="right"| 14,613   
  
|Progressive Conservative
|Del O'Brien
|align="right"| 7,561    
 
|New Democratic
|Robert Bob Cox
|align="right"| 4,419    
|}

See also 

 List of Canadian federal electoral districts
 Past Canadian electoral districts

External links 

 Website of the Parliament of Canada

Former federal electoral districts of Ontario